The women's pentathlon at the 1974 European Athletics Championships was held in Rome, Italy, at Stadio Olimpico on 3 and 4 September 1974.

Medalists

Results

Final
3/4 September

Participation
According to an unofficial count, 16 athletes from 9 countries participated in the event.

 (2)
 (3)
 (1)
 (2)
 (1)
 (3)
 (1)
 (2)
 (1)

References

Pentathlon
Combined events at the European Athletics Championships
1974 in women's athletics